In Greek mythology, Acaste (Ancient Greek: Ἀκάστη Akastê), the nurse and guardian of the daughters of king Adrastus of Argos.

Thebaid
From Statius's Latin poem the Thebaid:

Note

References 
 Parada, Carlos, Genealogical Guide to Greek Mythology, Jonsered, Paul Åströms Förlag, 1993. .
 Statius, Statius with an English Translation by J. H. Mozley, Volume I, Silvae, Thebaid, Books I–IV, Loeb Classical Library No. 206, London: William Heinemann, Ltd., New York: G. P. Putnamm's Sons, 1928. . Internet Archive.
Women in Greek mythology
Mythology of Argos

Characters in Greek mythology